Live from First Avenue, Minneapolis was released by Mark Mallman in 2003. Fifth album from Mallman.  It was released on September 23, 2003 on Susstones and re-released on Jackpine Social Club on February 28, 2006.

Track listing
"Cannibalive"
"Who's Gonna Save You Now?"
"Natural Blues"
"Hook Hand"
"Butcher's Ballad"
"Goodnight Goodbye"
"Life Between Heartbeats"
"Baby Takes It Slow"
"Love Look at You"
"We Only Have Each Other in the Night"
"Mother Made Me Do It"
"The Dead Bedroom" (Closing Theme)

Enhanced CD bonuses
Also included on the CD are bonuses accessible through a computer's CD-ROM drive:
"Cinnamon Girl" mp3 (bonus live recording)
Live video of "Butcher's Ballad"

Personnel
Ryan Smith/Jacques Wait — guitars
Kathie Hixon — bass
Peter Anderson — drums
Eric Kassel — synthesizer
Mark Wade — upright bass

Extra personnel
Lila Mallman — Guest vocals on "Mother Made Me Do It"
Missy Heitz — vocals on "Dead Bedroom"
Christopher McGuire — extra percussion on "Butcher's Ballad"

Production
Lee Marcucci/Ron Anderson/Tom Cesario/Myles Kennedy — Live engineers
Dan Witt/Scot Tuma/Dan Boen/Eric Furlong — tracking
Ed Ackerson — mixing
Brad Cassetto — mastering

Recording information
The album was recorded at the First Avenue Mainroom (4/19/2003) and 7th Street Entry (11/22/2002) - with the exception of "Butcher's Ballad" recorded in the Mainroom (11/9/2001). "Dead Bedroom" is the exit music, which was prerecorded.

References

Mark Mallman albums
2003 live albums